Amfilochia is a town and a municipality in the northwestern part of Aetolia-Acarnania in Greece, on the site of ancient Amfilochia.  Under the Ottoman Empire, it was known as Karvasaras (Καρβασαράς; from caravanserai).

Amfilochia is situated by the Ambracian Gulf and features an amphitheatre.  Amfilochia dates back to the ancient times and also features the ancient cities of Amphilochian Argos and Limnaia (or Limnaea).

History 
According to Pausanias, it is named after king Amphilochos, son of Amphiaraus. After the fall of Troy, Amphilochos settled in the area, which consequently was called Amphilochoi until the time of Pausanias.

Under the Ottoman Empire, Ali Pasha of Ioannina, forcibly relocated residents of another village to the current location of the town and established a motel (serai in Turkish) to serve passing caravans. This was how the name Karvasaras came up.

In July 1944 a battle took place in the town between ELAS of the Greek Resistance against the occupation forces and their local collaborators, that resulted in victory for the Resistance.

Municipality

The municipality Amfilochia was formed at the 2011 local government reform by the merger of the following 3 former municipalities, that became municipal units:
Amfilochia
Inachos
Menidi

The municipality has an area of 1090.991 km2, the municipal unit 397.879 km2.

Subdivisions
The municipal unit of Amfilochia is divided into the following communities:
Amfilochia (Amfilochia, Boukka, Limnaia and Platos)
Ampelaki (Ampelaki, Amfilochiko Argos, Ariada, Kampos and Keramidi)
Anoixiatiko (Anoixiatiko, Agia Triada, Katafourko, Mavrorachi, Moni Retha, Xirolivado, Petralona, Profitis Ilia, Ptelea, Skreiko, Triantafylloula, Tsoukka, Psila Alonia) 
Kechrinia (Kechrinia, Agioi Theodoroi, Kanalos, Kompothekla, Makrychoria, Falangias)
Loutro (Loutro, Krikellos, Xirakia)
Megas Kampos
Sardinia (Sardinia, Kalyvia)
Sparto (Sparto, Pigadaki, Tria Alonia)
Stanos
Varetada

Population

Transportation

Amfilochia has a port which is sometimes used for the import of grain. It is linked with the GR-5 (E55 and E951, Antirrio - Messolonghi - Ioannina) and is also traversed by the GR-42 that serves Vonitsa, Preveza and the island of Lefkada.  Amfilochia is linked with the Ionia Odos, a toll road that bypasses the town itself.  Amfilochia is not linked with a railway.

Notable people 
Kyriakos Sfetsas (born 1945), composer
Nikolaos Stratos (1872–1922), politician and Prime Minister of Greece
Andreas Stratos (1905–1981), politician and historian
Vlasios Tsirogiannis, military officer

See also
List of cities in ancient Epirus
A part of this article is translated from the German Wikipedia

References

External links
 Municipality of Amfilochia 
 Amfilochia (municipality) information
 Amfilochia (town) information

Municipalities of Western Greece
Populated places in Aetolia-Acarnania
Mediterranean port cities and towns in Greece
Acarnania